Johannes Müller (1880–1964) was a German politician and from 17 May 1927 until 28 March 1933 mayor of Marburg. He later became a member of the CDU.

References 

1880 births
1964 deaths
People from the Kingdom of Saxony
Christian Democratic Union of Germany politicians
Mayors of Marburg